Ciecere Parish is an administrative unit of Saldus Municipality, Latvia. It was created in 2010 from the countryside territory of Brocēni town. At the beginning of 2014, the population of the parish was 1028.

History 
Historically, the territory of Ciecere parish housed the Lemut Manor (Gut Lemsern), the Lielciecere Manor (Gut Groß-Zezern, Lielciecere), the Mazciecere Manor (Gut Klein-Zezern).
In 1927, the area of Brocēni parish was 44.79 km², Ciecere parish - 65.23 km². In 1930, both parishes were merged and renamed "Brocēni Parish", but in 1931 it was renamed "Ciecere Parish". In 1935, Kuldīga district Ciecere parish had an area of 120 km² and a population of 2,028.  In 1945, Brocēni village was established in the parish. Cieceres and Lake village council (Selsoviet), but the parish was liquidated in 1949. In 1950, Saldus district Brocēni was granted the status of urban-type settlement (from 1961 - city village) and a part of Brocēni village was added to it, creating Brocēni village territory . The liquidated village of Ciecere was added to it in 1956. In 1992, the Brocēni were granted city rights. In 1999, part of the rural territory was included in the city of Saldus. In 2001, the city of Brocēni with a rural territory became part of the newly established Brocēni Municipality. In 2009, the rural territory of Brocēni was separated as a separate administrative unit and in 2010 renamed Ciecere Parish.

Geography 
Ciecere parish has several small rivers —
and lakes —
Baltezers, Lake Brocēni, Lake Cieceres, Luknis, Mellezeris.

Towns, villages and settlements of Ciecere parish 
 Brocēnmuiža
 Emburga
 Lielciecere
 Oškalni

References 

Parishes of Latvia
Saldus Municipality
Courland